Nemanja Đurišić (born February 23, 1992) is a Montenegrin professional basketball player for Stal Ostrów Wielkopolski of the Polish Basketball League (PLK). Đurišić is also currently a member of Montenegrin national basketball team and during his college years he played for the basketball team at University of Georgia in the United States. He can play both small or power forward position. He is one of the few players from Montenegro who completed all 4 years of basketball scholarship at the university in the United States.

Early life
Đurišić grew up in the neighborhood of Stari Aerodrom, Podgorica, and started playing basketball at age of 12, for the local basketball club Sinalco. He was persuaded to start playing basketball by his brother Boris. His childhood basketball idol was Vlade Divac and as a kid he loved watching Yugoslavian national basketball team, who were a powerhouse during the 1990s and early 2000s. After taking his first basketball steps in Sinalco, Đurišić joined the youth academy of KK Budućnost Podgorica, where he gained an audience with several scouts.

High school
After completing first 2 years of high school in Podgorica Đurišić got an offer to finish his high school overseas, in South Kent School, and be part of their basketball team. Despite his lack of knowledge in English language at the time he managed to prove himself well both as a basketball player and as a student, which led to him deciding to pursue basketball scholarship at a college in the US. In two seasons for South Kent Đurišić averaged 20.1 points and 10.3 rebounds per game.
During his high school years Đurišić also made appearances for Montenegrin national basketball team at FIBA Europe Under-18 Championship.

College career

Freshman year
In 2011 Đurišić enrolled at the University of Georgia and was immediately recognized as skillful basketball player by the coaching staff. In his freshman year for the Bulldogs Đurišić started in 12 games at the power forward position, including four of the last five games of the season.

Sophomore year
In 2011–12 season Đurišić had team's only double-double of the season in SEC Tourney win over Miss. State. During his sophomore year Đurišić gained more playing minutes and had scores a career-high 21 points against Florida A&M.

Junior year
In 2013–14 Đurišić had a breakthrough year and was a key player from the bench for the Bulldogs. During junior year he was team's best 3-point shooter, in terms of percentage. He set a new career-high, with 22 points in a win against South Carolina.

Senior year
During his senior year Đurišić became one of team's top players and a regular starter. In a game against Tennessee, he became the 44th player in UGA history to reach 1,000 career points. Đurišić scored 35 points in two games vs. #1-ranked Kentucky, including team-high 18 at home against the Wildcats. He nearly had a triple-double in Georgia's win over Fla. Atlantic, with 8 pts., 10 rebs. and a career-best 8 assists (no UGA player has ever recorded a triple-double). Đurišić is one of just 19 players in UGA history to score 1,000 points and pull down 500 rebounds.

College statistics

|-
| style="text-align:left;"| 2011–12
| style="text-align:left;"| Georgia
| 32 || 12 || 19.8 || .405 || .364 || .659 || 4.2 || 0.8 || 0.4 || 0.2 || 7.0
|-
| style="text-align:left;"| 2012–13
| style="text-align:left;"| Georgia
| 32 || 10 || 24.4 || .395 || .317 || .747 || 4.3 || 1.4 || 0.5 || 0.3 || 7.9
|-
| style="text-align:left;"| 2013–14
| style="text-align:left;"| Georgia
| 34 || 3 || 22.9 || .482 || .432 || .684 || 4.0 || 0.8 || 0.5 || 0.4 || 8.4
|-
| style="text-align:left;"| 2014–15
| style="text-align:left;"| Georgia
| 33 || 32 || 30.0 || .468 || .340 || .704 || 5.2 || 1.5 || 0.7 || 0.5 || 11.0
|-
| colspan=2 style="text-align:center;"| Career
| 131 || 57 || 24.3 || .438 || .363 || .702 || 4.4 || 1.1 || 0.5 || 0.3 || 8.6

Professional career

Stelmet Zielona Góra
In August 2015 Đurišić signed a one-year contract with Stelmet Zielona Góra. He averaged 5.0 points and 3.3 rebounds per game in EuroLeague.
In July 2016 Đurišić re-signed with the team for one more year.

Filou Oostende
After a season with Telekom Baskets Bonn in Germany, he signed with Filou Oostende for the 2018–19 season.

Beşiktaş Sompo Japan
On July 12, 2019, he has signed contract with Beşiktaş Sompo Japan of the BSL. He averaged 10 points and 4 rebounds per game.

Estudiantes
On July 28, 2020, he signed with Movistar Estudiantes of the Liga ACB.

Stal Ostrów Wielkopolski
On August 11, 2022, he has signed with Stal Ostrów Wielkopolski of the Polish Basketball League (PLK).

International career
In September 2016 Durišić helped Montenegro's basketball team  reach EuroBasket 2017, through qualifiers, averaging 9.7 points and 2.7 rebounds per game. He scored a game-high 17 points in Montenegro's only loss of the qualifiers, against Georgia.

Personal life
Đurišić majored in International relations and affairs at UGA. His parents, Snežana and Ranko Đurišić, both from Montenegro, took part in their first-ever UGA game on February 28, 2015, on the occasion of their first visit to the US and participated as well in the Senior Day recognition before Kentucky game on March 3, 2015.

In June 2020, he married Miss Turkey 2013 contestant Ezgi Avcı.

References

1992 births
Living people
Basket Zielona Góra players
BC Oostende players
Beşiktaş men's basketball players
CB Estudiantes players
Montenegrin expatriate basketball people in Turkey
Forwards (basketball)
Georgia Bulldogs basketball players
Liga ACB players
Montenegrin expatriate basketball people in Belgium
Montenegrin expatriate basketball people in Germany
Montenegrin expatriate basketball people in Poland
Montenegrin expatriate basketball people in the United States
South Kent School alumni
Sportspeople from Podgorica
Stal Ostrów Wielkopolski players
Telekom Baskets Bonn players
Montenegrin expatriate basketball people in Spain